"Tequila Talkin'" is the debut single by American country music band Lonestar, released in August 1995 from their self-titled debut album. The song was written by Bill LaBounty and Chris Waters. It peaked at number 8 in the United States and at number 11 in Canada.

Content
The song's narrator was drunk on tequila when he told his former lover that he was still in love with her, though he was not.

Critical reception
Larry Flick, of Billboard magazine reviewed the song favorably, calling it a "great country lyric about longing and regret magnified through a bottle". He went on to say that "nice vocal and solid production make this accessible to radio". Rick Mitchell criticized the song in his review of the album, saying that it seemed derivative of the Eagles' "Tequila Sunrise".

Chart positions
"Tequila Talkin" entered the U.S. Billboard Hot Country Singles & Tracks at 69 for the week of August 19, 1995. The commercial single release, a double A-side with "No News", reached number 22 on the Bubbling Under Hot 100.

References

1995 songs
1995 debut singles
Lonestar songs
Songs written by Bill LaBounty
Songs written by Chris Waters
Song recordings produced by Don Cook
BNA Records singles
Songs about alcohol